Glyceryl hydroxystearate, also known as glyceryl monohydroxystearate (GMHS), is an organic chemical compound with the molecular formula C21H42O5. It is a whitish- or pale yellow-colored powder found in a variety of cosmetics and skin-care products.

Uses 
Glyceryl hydroxystearate is an ingredient found in some personal-care products. It is commonly used as an emollient, emulsifying agent, or bodying agent. It is often found in facial-care, foot-care, and lip-care products, sunblock, self-tanners, moisturizers, shampoos, creams, lotions, soaps, concealers, and roll-ons and sun-exposure treatments.

References 

Fatty acid esters